Polyommatus poseidon is a butterfly of the family Lycaenidae. It was described by Julius Lederer in 1852. It is found from Kütahya in western Turkey to Artvin in north-eastern Turkey, as well as in Georgia.

Males have plesiomorphic blue colouration of the upper side of the wings with no specific morphological characters.

References

Butterflies described in 1852
Polyommatus
Butterflies of Europe
Butterflies of Asia